Earl Nicholas McArthur Jr. (January 1, 1925 - July 17, 2016) was a suffragan bishop of the Episcopal Diocese of West Texas.

Early life and education
McArthur was born in Houston, Texas on January 1, 1925 to Earl Nicholas McArthur Sr. and Nanabelle Stanfield. He served in the U.S. Navy in the Pacific between 1943 and 1946. He then studied at Rice University from where he earned a Bachelor of Arts in 1948 and later undertook postgraduate studies at the University of Houston between 1948 and 1949. He then spent a number of years working as a petroleum engineer and district manager for drilling mud sales for the Alamo Lumber Company. In 1960, he commenced theological studies at the  Virginia Theological Seminary, from where he graduated with a Master of Divinity in 1963.

Ordained Ministry
McArthur was ordained deacon in 1963 and then priest on January 15, 1964 by Bishop Everett Holland Jones of West Texas]]. He served as deacon-in-charge and later rector of the Church of the Annunciation in Luling, Texas between 1963 and 1965, after which he became associate rector of the Church of the Holy Spirit in Houston, Texas. In 1967, he was called to serve as rector of All Saints' Church in Corpus Christi, Texas, while in 1981 he transferred to Wimberley, Texas to take upon himself the post of rector of St Stephen's Church.

Bishop
On September 19, 1987, MacArthur was elected on the fifth ballot as Suffragan Bishop of the Episcopal Diocese of West Texas. He was consecrated on January 6, 1988 by Presiding Bishop Edmond L. Browning in the First United Methodist Church, Corpus Christi, Texas. He then retired on December 31, 1993. He died in Wimberley, Texas on July 17, 2016. He married Shirley Beth Nyberg on February 4, 1948 and together had two sons and two daughters.

References

1925 births
2016 deaths
Place of birth missing
20th-century American Episcopalians
Episcopal bishops of West Texas
Virginia Theological Seminary alumni
Rice University alumni
University of Houston alumni